WMNS-LD, virtual and UHF digital channel 22, is a low-powered independent television station serving the United States Virgin Islands that is licensed to Charlotte Amalie, Saint Thomas. The station is owned by V.I. Christian Ministries, Inc.; Innovative Communications Corporation, which owns cable-only channel TV2, operates WMNS-LD under a local marketing agreement (LMA). WMNS-LD's transmitter is located atop Hawk Hill.

History
The station was founded on October 17, 2001 as K22GA. It gained the WMNS-LP callsign on December 22, 2003.

Prior to July 13, 2009, WMNS-LP broadcast Daystar programming. However, after CBS programming moved from WVXF to the cable-only channel TV2, WMNS-LD now provides over-the-air coverage for TV2.

Subchannel

External links
 

MNS-LD
Low-power television stations in the United States
Television channels and stations established in 2001
2001 establishments in the United States Virgin Islands